Gubeng is the name of a sub-district (kelurahan), which is a part of a district (kecamatan) with the same name in Surabaya, East Java, Indonesia.

Galleries

Populated places in East Java
Districts of East Java